Hererolandia pearsonii is a species of flowering plants in the family Fabaceae. It belongs to the subfamily Caesalpinioideae. It is native to Namibia.

References

External links 

Caesalpinieae
Fabaceae genera
Monotypic Fabaceae genera
Taxa named by Louisa Bolus